ABD Futebol Clube is a Brazilian football club of the city of Santo Antônio de Goiás, in the state of Goiás.

History
Founded on November 20, 1971, The professional championships disputed by ABD were:
Campeonato Goiano Third Division: 2021.

The team was manage by Everton Goiano.

Stadium
The matches of ABD Futebol Clube are held at the Estádio Antônio Genoveva belonging to the Municipal Government.

Players

Squad 2021

References 

Football clubs in Goiás